The Bovenschulte senate is the current state government of Bremen, sworn in on 15 August 2019 after Andreas Bovenschulte was elected as Mayor by the members of the Bürgerschaft of Bremen. It is the 25th Senate of Bremen.

It was formed after the 2019 Bremen state election by the Social Democratic Party (SPD), Alliance 90/The Greens (GRÜNE), and The Left (LINKE), and was the first government in a former West German state to include the Left party. Excluding the Mayor, the senate comprises eight ministers, called Senators. Three are members of the SPD, three are members of the Greens, and two are members of The Left.

Formation 

The previous Senate was a coalition government of the SPD and Greens led by Mayor Carsten Sieling of the SPD.

The election took place on 26 May 2019, and resulted in substantial losses for the SPD and an improvement for the Greens. The opposition CDU narrowly surpassed the SPD to become the largest party for the first time in the state's history. The Left recorded a small swing, while the AfD and FDP remained steady on 6% each. BiW retained their single seat in Bremerhaven.

After the election, CDU leader Carsten Meyer-Heder said that he hoped to become Mayor in a coalition with the Greens and FDP, while the SPD and Left called for a coalition between the Greens and their two parties. The Greens stated that they were open to both possibilities.

After holding consultations with various parties, the Greens announced on 5 June that they would seek a coalition with the SPD and Left. Negotiations between the three parties began on 12 June. They finalised their coalition agreement on 1 July.

On the same day, Carsten Sieling announced that, due to the losses suffered by the SPD in the election, he would not stand for re-election as Mayor. On 6 July, the SPD state congress nominated Andreas Bovenschulte, who had been elected as parliamentary group leader the previous week, as Sieling's successor with 140 votes out of 146. The SPD, Greens, and Left officially signed the coalition agreement on 13 August.

Bovenschulte was elected Mayor by the Bürgerschaft on 15 August, winning 47 votes out of 82 cast.

Composition

References

External links

Government of Bremen (state)
State governments of Germany
Cabinets established in 2019
2019 establishments in Germany